At least three ships of the Brazilian Navy have been named Javary:
 , a French-built monitor sunk in the harbor of Rio de Janeiro on 22 November 1893 during the Revolta da Armada, the 1893–94 Naval Revolt
 , launched in 1939 she was purchased while still incomplete by the United Kingdom and renamed HMS Havant

Brazilian Navy ship names